Meares Island is one of the many islands surrounding the Village of Tofino, British Columbia, Canada. The island is located in the Clayoquot Sound region and is the location of Opitsat, the main village of the Tla-o-qui-aht First Nations, and was the location of Fort Defiance, a short-lived American fur-trading post founded by Captain Robert Gray.

Meares Island is reachable by boat or water taxi.

Meares Island became historically significant shortly after 1984, when the Nuu-chah-nulth and environmentalist groups such as Greenpeace and Friends of Clayoquot Sound began protesting forestry giant MacMillan Bloedel's potential harvesting activities. The Nuu-chah-nulth, with significant cooperation from environmental groups, eventually erected a blockade, preventing MacMillan Bloedel from logging the island. Both sides pursued legal action, and the court ruled that since the Nuu-chah-nulth had claimed that this was part of their traditional territory, until that claim was resolved, no development could occur on the whole of Meares Island. This essentially granted an injunction in favour of the Nuu-chah-nulth, which was the first time in British Columbia's history that the province had been overruled on a land claims issue. According to Ecodefense, opponents of logging have spiked thousands of trees on Meares Island.

Geographical features 

 Lone Cone
 Mount Colnett

References

External links
 Meares Island, BC Geographical Names

Islands of British Columbia
Landforms of Vancouver Island
Clayoquot Sound region